Parotocinclus spilurus is a species of catfish in the family Loricariidae. It is native to South America, where it occurs in the Salgado River in the state of Ceará in Brazil. The species reaches 4 cm (1.6 inches) SL.

References 

Loricariidae
Otothyrinae
Fish described in 1941